Carl Fischer (9 October 1876 – 7 August 1953) was a Danish actor. He appeared in more than 25 films between 1911 and 1948.

Selected filmography
 5 raske piger (1933)
 Ud i den kolde sne (1934)
 Panserbasse (1936)
 Blaavand melder storm (1938)
 I de gode, gamle dage (1940)
 Moster fra Mols (1943)

References

External links

1876 births
1953 deaths
Danish male film actors
Place of birth missing